Vincent Ernest "Vince" Vieluf (pronounced Vee-loff; born November 10, 1970) is an American actor. He is best known for his roles in Rat Race and the short-lived UPN sitcom Love, Inc.

Life and career
Vieluf was born in Joliet, Illinois, and spent most of his youth in Portland, Texas.

He has starred in such movies as An American Werewolf in Paris, Rat Race, National Lampoon's Barely Legal, and Grind. He also played in a made-for-TV movie called Snow Wonder. Vieluf has also appeared on the television hits ER and Friends

In 2006 he had a role in the suspense thriller Firewall as vicious henchman Pim.

Vieluf played the dumbfound Blaine Cody in the 2001 comedy Rat Race. Before Rat Race, Vieluf appeared in An American Werewolf in Paris and Clay Pigeons. In 2006, Vieluf appeared as a jock version of Wolverine in the parody flick Epic Movie.

One of his television appearances (if not his first) was in 1997's On the Edge of Innocence. Vieluf made an appearance on the hit series Friends in 2001. His character, Ned, pretended to be in love with his professor Ross in order to pass a test. He is also a star in UPN's sitcom Love, Inc. as Barry, a wingman whose quirky ways and comments always stun the customers and employees. Vieluf made an appearance on the television series ER as Bernard Gamely.

He has also appeared in three episodes of CSI: Crime Scene Investigation playing Connor Foster in the episodes "Homebodies", "Ending Happy" and "Disarmed and Dangerous". Additionally, he appeared in the spinoff series CSI: Miami as Gil Callem.

Vieluf was the director and writer of the 2010 film Order of Chaos.

Filmography 

Sources:

References

External links

1970 births
Living people
American male film actors
American male television actors
Actors from Joliet, Illinois
Male actors from Illinois
People from Portland, Texas